Ukrit Wongmeema (born 9 July 1991 in Phitsanulok, Thailand) is Thai a professional footballer from Thailand. He played for Phrae United in the Thai League 2 as a goalkeeper.

International career

He debut for U-19 team in 2010 AFC U-19 Championship against Saudi Arabia
He represented Thailand U23 in the 2011 Southeast Asian Games and the 2013 Southeast Asian Games.

Honours

Club
Buriram
 Regional League Division 2 Champions (1): 2010
 Thai Division 1 League Champions (1): 2011

International
Thailand U-19
 AFF U-19 Youth Championship (1): 2009

Thailand U-23
 Sea Games  Gold Medal (1); 2013

References

External links
 Profile at Goal

Living people
1991 births
Ukrit Wongmeema
Ukrit Wongmeema
Association football goalkeepers
Ukrit Wongmeema
Ukrit Wongmeema
Ukrit Wongmeema
Ukrit Wongmeema
Ukrit Wongmeema
Ukrit Wongmeema
Ukrit Wongmeema
Ukrit Wongmeema
Southeast Asian Games medalists in football
Competitors at the 2011 Southeast Asian Games
Competitors at the 2013 Southeast Asian Games